Charles Munn may refer to:

Charles Munn (politician) (1887–1973), politician from Minnesota
Charles A. Munn III (born 1954), American conservationist
Charles Allen Munn (1859–1924), editor of Scientific American

See also
Charles L. Munns (born 1950), retired American Navy officer